The olive oropendola (Psarocolius bifasciatus) is the largest member of the icterid family and rivals the Amazonian umbrellabird as the largest passerine bird in South America. It is sometimes placed in the genus Gymnostinops instead of Psarocolius. As suggested by its name, it is found widely – but often in low densities – throughout humid lowland forests of the Amazon Basin, with the notable exception of most of the Guiana Shield. It is sometimes split into two species, the western olive oropendola (P. yuracares) and the eastern Pará oropendola (P. bifasciatus), but the subspecies P. y. neivae is widely recognized as a hybrid swarm, and the vast majority of authorities consider them a single species.

Description
The sexes of this icterid are very different in size: the male is 52 cm (21 in) long and weighs 550 g (1.2 lbs); the smaller female is 41 cm (16 in) long and weighs 260 g (9.2 oz). Confusingly, the name "olive oropendola" is usually used for this combined species, despite the fact that the nominate subspecies has no olive to its plumage, as its head and chest are black (these are olive in P. b. yuracares). The back, wings and belly of this large oropendola are brown, the outer rectrices are yellow (i.e. tail appears all yellow from below), the bare facial skin is pink, the eyes are brown, and the bill is black with an orange tip. The superficially similar green oropendola has an olive back and wing-coverts, lacks extensive bare facial-skin, has a pale bill with an orange tip, and blue eyes.

Behavior
The olive oropendola is a canopy bird that most often is seen flying high over the tops of the trees. Compared to other oropendolas it is a "loner" most frequently seen alone or in pairs, and drawing less attention to itself than its cousins, despite the greater size. Small groups are seen occasionally, and may even mix with other oropendolas. The breeding colonies are small, usually with fewer than five birds. The nest is a hanging woven ball fibers and vines, 60–180 cm long, high in a tree. Relatively little is known about these bird's breeding habits.

The omnivorous diet appears to be fairly catholic. They may eat small vertebrates (especially amphibians and reptiles), large insects, nectar, and fruit. They often travel great distances through the forests, except when lingering around their nesting colony.

The song of the olive oropendola is a liquid, gurgling and "expanding" , given as a displaying male falls forward on a perch and rustles his wings over the back. Nasal  and  calls are given while in flight or when foraging.

Gallery

References

 Hilty, Steven L. (2003): Birds of Venezuela. Christopher Helm, London. 
 Olive Oropendola (Psarocolius bifasciatus yuracares) arthurgrosset.com. Retrieved on 15 January 2009.

olive oropendola
Birds of Brazil
olive oropendola
Birds of the Amazon Basin